Heinz Lorenz (7 August 1913 – 23 November 1985) was German Chancellor Adolf Hitler's Deputy Chief Press Secretary during World War II.

Biography
A native of Schwerin, he studied law and economics at the universary. He left school and in 1934 became a junior editor with the Deutsches Nachrichtenbüro DNB (German News Service). In 1936, he transferred to the Press Office and worked under Otto Dietrich, Press Chief of the NSDAP. He became a reserve officer and served as Hauptschriftführer of the DNB from late 1942 onwards.

In 1945, Lorenz became the deputy press attaché in the Führerbunker. Towards the end of the war, after Germany's own communications system was all but lost, Lorenz monitored Reuters on the BBC. Lorenz became part of a group who fabricated news reports by reviewing and re-writing Allied news reports. Lorenz worked for General Hans Krebs, Bernd von Freytag-Loringhoven and Gerhard Boldt. Hitler never learned of the deception.

On 28 April 1945, Lorenz provided Hitler with confirmation that Heinrich Himmler had contacted and attempted peace negotiations with the western Allies through Count Folke Bernadotte.

During the night of 28–29 April, Hitler ordered that three copies of his political testament be hand-delivered to Field Marshal Ferdinand Schörner in Czechoslovakia, Karl Dönitz in Schleswig-Holstein, and Paul Giesler in Tegernsee by Lorenz, Willy Johannmeyer, and Martin Bormann's adjutant SS-Standartenführer Wilhelm Zander, respectively. The three officers said their farewell to Hitler and were handed a white dossier with the testament by Martin Bormann at approximately 4.00 am on 29 April. Armed with automatic weapons and wearing helmets to break through Soviet lines, the officers left Berlin later that day.

Post-war
Lorenz made it through the Soviet Army encirclement of Berlin to the west. He was arrested by the British in June 1945. Lorenz was held in prison until mid-1947. Thereafter, Lorenz was private secretary to the Haus Hugo Stinnes from 1947 to 1953. He was parliamentary stenographer for the West German Bundestag from 1953 to 1958 and Leiter of the Stenographic Service of the Bundesrat from 1958 until retirement in 1978. Lorenz died in Düsseldorf on 23 November 1985 aged 72.

See also
 Battle of Berlin

Notes

References
 
 

German military personnel of World War II
1913 births
1985 deaths
Battle of Berlin